Samuel Peter Cox (born 10 October 1990) is a footballer who plays as a midfielder or defender who plays for National League South club Welling United. Born in England, he represents the Guyana national team. He also works as a coach at the Tottenham Hotspur Academy.

Club career
Cox was "having trials at Watford and Arsenal by the time he was nine years old".

Cox started his career in the Tottenham Hotspur Academy, at the age of 15. He joined the academy full-time in the 2007–08 season. During the 2008–09 season, he made 24 appearances in the under-18 team and two substitute appearances in the reserve team. Cox signed his first professional contract in July 2009.

Martin Allen manager of League Two side Cheltenham Town, signed Cox on a one-month loan deal on 1 September 2009. He made his debut on 10 October, in Cheltenham's 4–0 away loss to Accrington Stanley. Having failed to break through at Cheltenham he returned to Spurs on 12 October. On 13 November, Cox joined Conference National club Histon on loan for a month. He made his debut in Histon's 2–1 defeat away to Rushden & Diamonds on 14 November, before being substituted in the 67th minute.

In January 2010, he joined Torquay United on loan for the remainder of the season. He was released by Spurs at the end of the season and joined Barnet in June 2010. Having made 10 appearances in League Two for Barnet during the 2010–11 season Cox signed on loan for Conference South club Boreham Wood in October 2011. He was awarded 'Player of the Season' having helped the club achieve their highest ever finish in the league. In May 2012, Cox was released by Barnet due to the expiry of his contract.

On 5 July, Hayes & Yeading United announced the signing of Cox on a one-year deal after being released by League Two club Barnet in the summer. Cox was immediately announced as captain for the 2012–13 season and was given the 'Supporters' Player of the Year' award at the end of the season.

In summer 2013 Cox went on trial at Greenock Morton and Hamilton Academical though chose to sign for Boreham Wood again in August 2013. He captained the club as they won promotion to the National League for the first time ever in 2015 and was awarded the 'Chairman's Player of the Season' prize in the same year.

On 2 September 2016, Cox signed for Wealdstone. He was awarded 'Supporters Club Player of the Year' and 'Junior Stones Player of the Year' in May 2017 at the end of his first season for the club. As of April 2019 he was combining his playing career with Wealdstone with youth coaching at first club Tottenham Hotspur.

After a three-year stint with Hampton & Richmond Borough, which included a loan spell between 2018 and 2019, Cox made the move to fellow National League South side, Braintree Town in March 2022. On 11 May 2022, Cox announced via his Twitter page that he would be leaving the club following the conclusion of the 2021–22 campaign. Cox joined Welling United in July 2022.

International career
Cox was born and raised in England, but is of Guyanese descent. He was called up to the Guyana national team in May 2015. In March 2019, he was captain of Guyana, who qualified for the CONCACAF Gold Cup for the first time in their history.

Style of play
Cox plays as a holding midfielder or as a right sided defender.

Coaching career 
Cox holds a UEFA A Licence and works at the Tottenham Hotspur Academy where he began his playing career. In November 2018 he won the Ugo Ehiogu 'Ones To Watch' award at the 'Football Black List'.

Personal life
Cox was Brent Cross cross country champion for four consecutive years from 2003 to 2006 and 800 metres champion three successive years from 2003 to 2005.

Career statistics

Club

International

References

External links
 
 
 Sam Cox Interview
 Guyana captain Sam Cox on 'life-changing' journey with Golden Jaguars

1990 births
Living people
English people of Guyanese descent
Black British sportspeople
Footballers from Edgware
English footballers
Guyanese footballers
Association football defenders
Tottenham Hotspur F.C. players
Cheltenham Town F.C. players
Histon F.C. players
Torquay United F.C. players
Barnet F.C. players
Boreham Wood F.C. players
Hayes & Yeading United F.C. players
Wealdstone F.C. players
Hampton & Richmond Borough F.C. players
Braintree Town F.C. players
Welling United F.C. players
English Football League players
National League (English football) players
Guyana international footballers
2019 CONCACAF Gold Cup players
Tottenham Hotspur F.C. non-playing staff